The Nostrand Avenue station is a local station on the IRT Eastern Parkway Line of the New York City Subway. Located at the intersection of Nostrand Avenue and Eastern Parkway in Crown Heights, Brooklyn, it is served by the 3 train at all times except late nights, when the 4 train takes over service. There is also limited rush hour 2 and 5 service here.

The station opened on August 23, 1920, as part of an extension of the IRT Eastern Parkway Line by the Interborough Rapid Transit Company. The station's platforms were extended in the 1964—1965 fiscal year so they could accommodate ten-car trains.

History

Background 
Nostrand Avenue station was constructed as part of the Eastern Parkway Line. The line's section to Atlantic Avenue was part of Contract 2 of the Interborough Rapid Transit Company (IRT)'s plan to construct an extension of the original subway, Contract 1. Contract 2 extended the original line from City Hall in Manhattan to Atlantic Avenue in Brooklyn. The Board of Rapid Transit Commissioners approved the route on September 27, 1900, and the contract was signed on September 11, 1902. Construction commenced on Contract 2 on March 4, 1903. The first section opened on January 9, 1908, extending the subway from Bowling Green to Borough Hall. On April 28, 1908, the IRT formally applied with the New York Public Service Commission for permission to open the final section of the Contract 2 line from Borough Hall to Atlantic Avenue near the Flatbush Avenue LIRR station. The application was approved, and the IRT extension opened on May 1, 1908.

On March 19, 1913, New York City, the Brooklyn Rapid Transit Company, and the IRT reached an agreement, known as the Dual Contracts, to drastically expand subway service across New York City. As part of Contract 3 of the agreement, between New York City and the IRT, the original subway opened by the IRT in 1904 to City Hall, and extended to Atlantic Avenue in 1908, was to be extended eastward into Brooklyn. The line was to be extended along Flatbush Avenue and Eastern Parkway to Buffalo Street as a four-track subway line, and then along East 98th Street and Livonia Avenue to New Lots Avenue as an elevated two-track line, with provisions for the addition of a third track. In addition, a two-track branch line along Nostrand Avenue branching off east of the Franklin Avenue station was to be constructed. The underground portion of the line became known as the Eastern Parkway Line, or Route 12, while the elevated portion became known as the New Lots Line.

Construction and opening 
The IRT Eastern Parkway Line was built as part of Route 12 from 1915 to 1918.  On August 23, 1920, the Eastern Parkway Line was extended from Atlantic Avenue to Crown Heights–Utica Avenue, with the Nostrand Avenue station opening at this time. The new trains would be served by trains from Seventh Avenue.

Later years 

Station layout

This underground station has two levels. The upper level serves New Lots Avenue-bound trains while the lower level serves Manhattan-bound trains. From north to south, each level has an express track, a local track, and one side platform. The 3 train stops here at all times except late nights, when the 4 train takes over service. There is also limited rush hour 2 and 5 train service here. During all times except late nights, 4 trains run on the express track to the north of the local track on each level to bypass the station.

Both platforms have their original Dual Contracts-era IRT trim line and name tablets. The trim line has a tan-yellow center, brown border, and a spec of blue in-between. "N" tablets on a blue background and brown border run along the trim line at regular intervals. The name tablets read "NOSTRAND AVE." in serif font in gold lettering on a blue and brown background, a gold center, and brown border.

The platform extensions at either end have signs reading "NOSTRAND AVE" in white sans serif lettering on a brown border. The center of the platforms has green I-beam columns at regular intervals with alternating ones having the standard black station name plate in white lettering.

West of this station (railroad north), the perpendicular IRT Nostrand Avenue Line merges with the IRT Eastern Parkway Line at the Rogers Avenue Junction. President Street–Medgar Evers College on that line is two blocks to the south.

Exits 
The upper level has one fare control at the center with two staircases going down to the lower level. It has a turnstile bank, token booth, and two staircases going up to the south side mall of Eastern Parkway (between the main and service roads) and Nostrand Avenue. One staircase goes to the southeast corner while the other goes to the southwest corner.

References

External links 

 
 Brooklyn IRT: Map 2, Brooklyn IRT Dual Contracts (includes current and former track configurations, and provisions for future connections)
 Station Reporter — 3 Train

IRT Eastern Parkway Line stations
New York City Subway stations in Brooklyn
Railway stations in the United States opened in 1920
1920 establishments in New York City
Crown Heights, Brooklyn